Sergey Lapin may refer to:

Sergey Lapin (diplomat) (1912–1990), Soviet Union diplomat and politician
Sergey Lapin (police officer),  Russian police officer
Sergey Lapin (boxer) (born 1988), Ukrainian boxer